David Graham is a Canadian academic administrator and literary historian who has served in a number of Canadian universities. He is the former Provost and Vice-President, Academic affairs, at Concordia University in Montreal, Quebec. Prior to that role, he served as the university's Dean of the Faculty of Arts and Science.  Before working at Concordia, he held the positions of Professor, Department Head (French and Spanish Department) and later Dean of Arts at Memorial University of Newfoundland. His research is primarily concerned with the early modern French emblem books.

Publications
Graham, D., ed. (2001). An interregnum of the sign: the emblematic age in France: essays in honour of Daniel S. Russell. Glasgow emblem studies, 6. Glasgow: Glasgow Emblem Studies.

References

External links
David Graham named Provost and Vice-President Academic. Concordia University press release. February 29, 2008

Living people
Concordia University people
Year of birth missing (living people)
21st-century Canadian historians
Canadian male non-fiction writers
Academic staff of the Memorial University of Newfoundland
Canadian university and college faculty deans
Canadian university and college vice-presidents